Emma Schieck (August 6, 2001) is an American sitting volleyball player. She made her Paralympics debut during the 2020 Summer Paralympics, where she helped Team USA win a gold medal.

Early life
Schieck was born on August 6, 2001, to parents Charles and Elizabeth Schieck. As a result of birth complications, she suffered nerve damage which caused brachial plexus injury. Growing up, she played soccer but soon switched to volleyball. While playing for South Iredell High School and the Precision Athletics Volleyball Club, she was approached by two referees about considering sitting volleyball. One of the referees was Elliot Blake, Team USA's sitting volleyball manager, who encouraged Schieck to attend an informal tryout session in Virginia.

Career
In August 2021, Schieck was named to Team USA's National Sitting Volleyball Team to compete at the 2020 Summer Paralympics. Schieck made her Paralympics debut in a 75–31 win against Rwanda on August 27, 2021. In the gold-medal game against China, Schieck scored the final point to help Team USA win in four sets. Following the Games, she returned to school at the University of North Carolina at Chapel Hill.

References

Living people
2001 births
American sitting volleyball players
Women's sitting volleyball players
Paralympic volleyball players of the United States
Paralympic gold medalists for the United States
Paralympic medalists in volleyball
Volleyball players at the 2020 Summer Paralympics
Medalists at the 2020 Summer Paralympics